Short-track speed skating has been featured as a sport in the Asian Winter Games since the first winter games in 1986.

Editions

Events

Medal table

List of medalists

References 

 
Asian Winter Games
Sports at the Asian Winter Games